Hansel Manuel Robles (born August 13, 1990) is a Dominican professional baseball pitcher who is a free agent. He has previously played in Major League Baseball (MLB) for the New York Mets, Los Angeles Angels, Minnesota Twins and the Boston Red Sox.

Career

New York Mets
Robles signed as an international free agent in August 2008. Robles played in the minors with the Dominican Summer League Mets, Kingsport Mets, Brooklyn Cyclones, Gulf Coast League Mets, St. Lucie Mets, Binghamton Mets, and the Las Vegas 51s.

2015

The Mets added Robles to their 40-man roster on November 20, 2014. The Mets promoted him to the major leagues for the first time on April 20, 2015, to replace then-injured reliever Jerry Blevins.

He made his Major League debut on April 24 against the interleague-rival New York Yankees. He came into the game in the seventh inning giving up a hit to Alex Rodriguez to load the bases, then getting Mark Teixeira to pop out and struck out Brian McCann and Carlos Beltrán to end the inning.

On October 2 while facing the Philadelphia Phillies, Robles threw a quick pitch near the head of batter Cameron Rupp; both benches emptied but no fight occurred. As there had been hit batsmen earlier in the game, and warnings had been issued to both teams, Robles was immediately ejected by home plate umpire Bob Davidson. As a result of the incident, Robles was suspended for three games by Major League Baseball and fined an undisclosed amount. He appealed the suspension and was allowed to play for the rest of the season. When the Mets made the playoffs, Robles was part of the roster of the Mets all the way up to the 2015 World Series. Once the appeal process completed, the suspension carried over into 2016.

Robles appeared in the Division Series against the Los Angeles Dodgers in game two in the eighth inning getting two strikeouts. In the World Series against the Kansas City Royals he appeared in game two in the bottom of the sixth inning getting the three batters he faced out. He also appeared in game four in the top of the ninth inning getting three outs, two of them strikeouts.

Robles finished the season with a 4–3 record, 3.67 ERA in 57 games in 54 innings pitched with a WHIP of 1.019 with 61 strikeouts while giving up 37 hits, 27 runs (22 of them earned), 8 home runs, and 18 walks.

2016

Robles was not on the Mets' Opening Day roster due to his suspension, but joined the Mets for their home opener against the Philadelphia Phillies. On September 23 at Citi Field, Robles recorded his first career save after entering a game in the seventh inning and throwing hitless relief.

2017
In 2017, Robles underperformed. Before the summer began, he was demoted to Triple-A where he spent nearly two months before returning to the Mets. At the major league level, his walk rate increased for the second consecutive season and his home run rate nearly doubled.

2018
On January 12, Robles and the Mets agreed to a $900,000 deal, avoiding arbitration. Robles started the season in Triple-A, but was promoted on April 3 when Anthony Swarzak was placed on the disabled list with an oblique strain. He was optioned later in the month, and was called back up on May 5. Robles was designated for assignment on June 22. With the 2018 Mets, he compiled a 2–2 record with a 5.03 ERA in 16 relief appearances, striking out 23 batters in  innings.

Los Angeles Angels
On June 23, 2018, Robles was claimed off waivers by the Los Angeles Angels. With the Angels in 2018, he was 0-1 with 2 saves with a 2.97 ERA in 37 relief appearances, striking out 36 batters in  innings. Robles' continued success with the Angels continued into the 2019 season, as he recorded an ERA of 2.48 in 71 appearances. He also served as closer, recording 23 saves in  innings. On December 2, Robles was nontendered by the Angels.

Minnesota Twins
On December 29, 2020, Robles signed a one-year, $2 million deal with the Minnesota Twins. Through July 2021, Robles appeared in 45 games with the Twins, all in relief, compiling a 3–4 record with 4.91 ERA and 43 strikeouts in 44 innings pitched.

Boston Red Sox
On July 30, 2021, Robles was traded to the Boston Red Sox in exchange for minor-league pitcher Alex Scherff. Robles earned his first save with the Red Sox on August 24, against the Twins. During the regular season, Robles made 27 relief appearances for Boston, compiling an 0–1 record with a 3.60 ERA and four saves, while striking out 33 batters in 25 innings. He made six postseason appearances, allowing four runs (three earned) in  innings, as the Red Sox advanced to the American League Championship Series. On November 3, Robles elected to become a free agent.

On March 19, 2022, Robles re-signed with the Red Sox on a minor-league contract with an invitation to spring training. He successfully made Boston's roster for Opening Day. He was placed in the injured list due to back spasms in late May, and rejoined the team on June 9. He was designated for assignment by the Red Sox following their July 5 game against the Tampa Bay Rays. He compiled a 1–3 record with a 5.84 ERA and two saves for the 2022 Red Sox. Robles was released by Boston on July 9.

Los Angeles Dodgers
Robles signed a minor-league contract with the Los Angeles Dodgers on July 24, 2022. He was assigned to the  Oklahoma City Dodgers. He elected free agency on November 10, 2022.

References

External links

1990 births
Living people
Binghamton Mets players
Boston Red Sox players
Brooklyn Cyclones players
Dominican Republic expatriate baseball players in the United States
Dominican Summer League Mets players
Gulf Coast Mets players
Kingsport Mets players
Las Vegas 51s players
Los Angeles Angels players
Major League Baseball pitchers
Major League Baseball players from the Dominican Republic
Minnesota Twins players
New York Mets players
Oklahoma City Dodgers players
People from Bonao
Scottsdale Scorpions players
St. Lucie Mets players
Tigres del Licey players
World Baseball Classic players of the Dominican Republic
2017 World Baseball Classic players